Pediomelum digitatum is a species of flowering plant in the legume family known by the common name palmleaf Indian breadroot. It is found in the central United States.

References

Psoraleeae